Sophia Saint-Rémy Martelly (born October 9, 1965) is a Haitian health activist, politician, and former First Lady of Haiti from May 14, 2011, until February 7, 2016. She is the wife of the former President of Haiti, Michel Martelly. Martelly focused on issues related to public health, healthcare and alleviating malnutrition during her tenure as first lady.

Biography

Early life and marriage
Martelly was born by Sophia Saint-Rémy on October 9, 1965, in New York City in the United States. Her father, Charles Edouard Saint-Rémy, was from Gonaïves, and her mother, Mona Lisa Florez, is from Port-au-Prince. The Saint-Rémy family is originally from Gonaïves, where Sophia Saint Rémy was raised. The Saint-Remys suffered under the dictatorship of François "Papa Doc" Duvalier. Sophia Martelly's grandmother was arrested and detained by Duvalier , while two of her paternal relatives were executed during the Duvalier dictatorship.

Sophia Saint-Rémy and her future husband, singer and politician Michel Martelly, had been friends when they were children, but had lived separate lives as young adults. Michel Martelly immigrated to the United States with his American first wife during the 1980s.

In 1986, Michel Martelly divorced his first wife and returned to Haiti. Sophia Saint-Rémy and Martelly, who were childhood friends, reunited in 1987, shortly after he moved back to the country. However, when the couple tried to marry, both of their mothers objected based on their skin color: Sophia Martelly has lighter skin, while Michel Martelly has a darker complexion. Sophia Saint-Rémy and Michel Martelly ignored their parents' protests and, instead, moved to Miami, Florida, together later in 1987. The couple married in Miami in a small 1987 wedding ceremony. Michel Martelly worked in construction, while Sophia worked as a word processor. The couple returned to Haiti in 1988. They had four children, Olivier, Alexandre, Yani, and Michel.

The Martellys' early marriage was different from Michel Martelly's onstage "Sweet Mickey" persona. Michel Martelly instituted a curfew on Sophia and forbid her to chew gum as recently as the late 1990s. Martelly is four years younger than her husband.

The couple lived in a condo in Miami Beach, Florida, during the mid-1990s.

References

Living people
1965 births
First ladies and gentlemen of Haiti
People from Gonaïves
People from New York City